Stow Bardolph railway station, in the parish of  Stow Bardolph, Norfolk, served the villages of Stow Bardolph and Stowbridge. It closed in 1963.

The Lynn & Ely Railway Bill received the Royal Assent on 30 June 1845. Work started on the line in 1846 and the line and its stations were opened on 27 October 1846. Stow Station opened with the line and was situated South of Holme Gate Station and north of Downham Station. The line ran from Ely to Downham, the eventual destination being Ely.

References

External links

Former Great Eastern Railway stations
Disused railway stations in Norfolk
Railway stations in Great Britain opened in 1846
Railway stations in Great Britain closed in 1963
Stow Bardolph